Numismatic associations bring together groups of numismatists. They may be commercial, hobby or professional. Membership is sometimes by election.

List of international numismatic associations 
 British Art Medal Society (BAMS)
 Federation of European Numismatic Associations (FENAP)
 Fédération Internationale de la Médaille d'Art (FIDEM)
 International Association of Professional Numismatists (IAPN)
 International Bank Note Society (IBNS) 
 International Numismatic Council (INC)
 Oriental Numismatic Society (ONS)
 Société de Numismatique Asiatique (SNA)

List of numismatic associations (by country)

Armenia 
 Armenian Numismatic Society
 Armenian Numismatic Research Organization

Australia 
 ACT and District Coin Club
 Australian Numismatic Society
 Australian Numismatic Society NSW
 Australian Numismatic Society Queensland Branch
 Australian Society for Ancient Numismatics
 Bairnsdale and District Stamp and Coin Club
 Bathurst Stamp, Coin, Collectables and Lapidary Club
 Bendigo Coin & Collectables Club Inc
 Coffs Harbour Stamp and Coin Club
 Geelong Numismatic Society
 Gold Coast Coin Club
 IBNS (Melbourne Chapter)
 IBNS (Perth Chapter)
 IBNS (Sydney Chapter)
 Illawarra Numismatic Association
 Maitland and District Coin Club
 Melbourne Numismatic Society Inc
 Metropolitan Coin Club of Sydney
 Morwell Numismatic Society
 Mudgee Coin, Note & Stamp Club Inc.
 Nambucca Heads Stamp and Coin Club
 Newcastle Numismatic Society
 Numismatic Association of Australia
 Orange Coin and Stamp Club Inc
 Numismatic Association of Victoria Inc
 Numismatic Society of South Australia Inc
 Queensland Numismatic Society Inc
 Perth Numismatic Society Inc
 Redcliffe Coin and Phonecard Club
 Redland Bay Coin and Stamp Club
 Rockhampton Coin Club
 Sale & District Stamp & Coin Club
 Sapphire Coast Stamp & Coin Club
 South-West Coin Club
 Tasmanian Numismatic Society Inc – NAA
 Western Australian Roman Coin Study Group
 Yorke Peninsula Collectables Club

Austria 
 Österreichische Numismatische Gesellschaft (Austrian Numismatic Society)
 Verband Österreichischer Münzenhändler

Belgium 
 Association Belgo-Luxembourgeoise de Numismates Professionnels
 Royal Numismatic Society of Belgium (Société Royale de Numismatique de Belgique)

Brazil 
 Sociedade Numismática Brasileira (São Paulo-SP)
 Sociedade Numismática Paranaense (Curitiba-PR)
 Sociedade Numismática Amazonense (Manaus-AM)
 Sociedade Gaúcha de Numismática (Porto Alegre-RS)
 Sociedade Numismática de Joinville (Joinville-SC)
 Associação Mineira de Numismática (Belo Horizonte-MG)
 Associação Numismática de Brasília (Brasília-DF)
 Clube Numismático do Estado do Rio de Janeiro (Rio de Janeiro-RJ)
 Sociedade Goiana de Numismática (Goiânia-GO)

Canada 
 Canadian Association of Numismatic Dealers (CAND)
 Canadian Association of Token Collectors (CATC)
 Canadian Association of Wooden Money Collectors (CAWMC)
 Canadian Errors and Varieties Numismatic Association (CEVNA)
 Canadian Paper Money Society (CPMS)
 Canadian Tire Coupon Collectors Club
 Classical & Medieval Numismatic Society (CMNS)
 Medallic Art Society of Canada (MASC)
 Newfoundland Numismatic Enthusiasts (NNE)
 North Shore Numismatic Society 
 Numismatic Network Canada (NNC)
 Ontario Numismatic Association (ONA)
 Royal Canadian Numismatic Association (RCNA)
 Société Numismatique de Québec (SNQ)

China 
 China Numismatic Society (CNA)
 Hong Kong Numismatic Society
 Hong Kong Stamp and Coin Dealers Association
 Macau Numismatic Society
 Shanghai Numismatic Society

Denmark 
 Danish Numismatic Society
 Monthandler-Sammenslutningen af 1975

Finland 
 Finnish Numismatic Society

France 
 Société Française de Numismatique (French Numismatic Society)
 CGB Numismatique
 Groupe numismatique de Provence
 Société Française des Monnaies
 Société française de numismatique
 Syndicat National des Experts Numismates et Numismates Professionnels (SNENNP)
 Fédération Française des Associations Numismatiques (FFAN)
 Association Numismatique du Grand Sud Ouest (ANGSO)

Germany 
 Numismatische Gesellschaft zu Berlin (Berlin Numismatic Society)
 Berufsverband des Deutschen Münzenfachhandels (Professional Association of the German Coin Trade)
 Gesellschaft für Internationale Geldgeschichte (GIG) (Society for International Monetary History)
 Verband der Deutschen Münzenhändler (Association of German Coin Dealers)

Greece 
 Hellenic Numismatic Society

India 
 Indian Coin & Currency Group -"ICCG"  http://www.iccg.in/
 Karnataka Numismatic Society
 Kerala Numismatic Society
 Mumbai Coin Society
 Numismatic Society of Calcutta
 The Numismatic Society of India
 South Indian Numismatic Society

Israel 
 Israel Numismatic Society

Italy 
 Società Numismatica Italiana (Italian Numismatic Society)
 Numismatici Italiani Professionisti

Japan 
 Japanese Numismatic Association (JNA)
 Japan Numismatic Dealers' Association (JNDA)

Kuwait 
 KiSociety

Nepal 
  Nepal Numismatic Society

Netherlands 
 Nederlandse Vereniging van Munthandelaren (NVMH)
 Koninklijk Nederlands Genootschap voor Munt- en Penningkunde (Royal Dutch Numismatic Society)

New Zealand 
 Numismatic Society of Auckland Inc
 Royal Numismatic Society of New Zealand (RNSNZ)
 Tauranga Numismatic Society
 Waikato Numismatic Society
 Wanganui Numismatic Society

Poland 
 Polish Numismatic Society

Spain 
 Asociacion Espanola de Numismaticos Profesionales
 Asociación Numismática Española (Spanish Numismatic Society)
Societat Catalana d'Estudis Numismàtics

Sweden 
 Sveriges Mynthandlares Förening
 Svenska Numismatiska Föreningen (Swedish Numismatic Society)

Switzerland 
 Schweizerische Numismatische Gesellschaft/Société Suisse de Numismatique/Società Svizzera di Numismatica/Swiss Numismatic Society
 Verband Schweizer Berufsnumismatiker

Thailand 
 Numismatic Association of Thailand

United Kingdom 
The British Association of Numismatic Societies (BANS) maintains a list of affiliated societies.
 Banbury & District Numismatic Society
 Bathe & Bristol Numismatic Society
 Bexley Coin Club
 Birmingham Numismatic Society
 British Association of Numismatic Societies (BANS)
 British Association of Numismatic Societies (BANS)
 British Numismatic Society (BNS)
 British Numismatic Trade Association (BNTA)
 Cambridgeshire Numismatic Society
 Crawley Coin and Collectors Club
 Crewe and District Coin and Medal Society
 Devonshire Numismatic Society
 Devon & Exeter Numismatic Society
 Essex Numismatic Society
 Havering Numismatic Society
 Huddersfield Numismatic Society
 Historical Medal Society
 Ipswich Numismatic Society
 Lancashire & Cheshire Numismatic Society
 London Numismatic Club
 Money and Medals Network (MMN) 
 Norwich Coin & Medal Society
 Numismatic Society of Ireland (Northern Branch)
 Numismatic Society of Nottinghamshire
 Oriental Numismatic Society (ONS) 
 Ormskirk & West Lancashire Numismatic Society
 Oxford Numismatic Society
 Oxford University Numismatic Society
 Postal Order Society
 Plymouth Numismatic Society
 Reading Coin Club
 Romsey Numismatic Society
 Royal Numismatic Society (RNS)
 Southampton & District Numismatic Society
 South Manchester Numismatic Society
 South Wales & Monmouthshire Numismatic Society
 Token Corresponding Society
 Tyneside Numismatic Society
 Wessex Numismatic Society
 Wiltshire Numismatic Society
 Worthing and District Numismatic Society
 Yorkshire Numismatic Society

United States
American Israel Numismatic Association
American Numismatic Association (ANA) 
American Numismatic Society (ANS) 
American Vecturist Association (AVA)
Anchorage Coin Club
Ancient Coin Collectors Guild (ACCG)
Blue Ridge Numismatic Association (BRNA)
Central States Numismatic Society
Medal Collectors of America (MCA), founded in 1998 in Portland Oregon. "Its primary purpose was to serve collectors of world and U.S. art and historical medals. MCA would bring together those interested in collecting, research and publication of research concerning art and historical medals."
Numismatic & Antiquarian Society of Philadelphia (founded in 1857, the oldest numismatic organization in the United States)
Numismatic Literary Guild (NLG) 
Polish American Numismatic Society (PANS)
Rochester Numismatic Association
Russian Numismatic Society